Our Perfect Place is an Indian English family drama television series, which premiered on 28 March 2020 on Zee World. The series is aired every Monday - Sundays. The series is produced by Saregama Productions of Rahul Tewari.

Plot
The story of the show is about an extended family and the trials and tribulations between each family member. The show revolves around the lives of the Mehta family clan, their relationships with each other, their joys, sorrows and eventually their love for each other. Govardhan Mehta is a simple and traditional man, lives with his family.

Cast
 Shubhangi Latkar as Ila Mehta
 Kiran Kumar as Govardhan Mehta
 Maninder Singh as Rahul Mehta
 Suraj Kakkar as Sameer Mehta
 Harsh Vashisht as Parimal Mehta
 Mohit Sharma as Niranjan Mehta
 Simran Khanna as Tanuja Shah
 Priyanka Purohit as Hetal Shah
 Namrata Thapa as Gayatri Mehta
 Urvashi Sharma as Rita Mehta
 Sharad Joshi as Uday Mehta
 Mahima Nayak as Prachi
 Rishika Mihani as Maya

References

2016 Indian television series debuts
Hindi-language television shows
Indian television soap operas
Indian drama television series
Television shows set in Mumbai
Zee TV original programming